The Guilty Generation is a 1931 American pre-code crime film directed by Rowland V. Lee and starring Leo Carrillo, Constance Cummings and Robert Young.

Plot
The children of feuding gangsters fall in love and fight to escape their parents' notoriety.

Cast
 Leo Carrillo as Mike Palmiero
 Constance Cummings as Maria Palmiero
 Robert Young as Marco Ricca 
 Boris Karloff as Tony Ricca
 Emma Dunn as Nina Palmero
 Leslie Fenton as Joe Pamiero
 Murray Kinnell as Jerry 
 Ruth Warren as Nellie Weaver

See also
 Boris Karloff filmography

External links

1931 films
1931 drama films
American black-and-white films
American drama films
Columbia Pictures films
Films directed by Rowland V. Lee
1930s English-language films
1930s American films